The Attorney General Office (AGU) is a cabinet-level position in the Brazilian government charged with advising the Executive Branch and representing the federal government of Brazil in legal proceedings legally known as the Union (União). The Attorney General is defined under the Article 131 of the Brazilian Constitution as one of the essential functions of Brazilian judicial administration, along with the roles performed by the judicial branch, the Prosecutor's office, the public defenders and private lawyers. The current Attorney General is Jorge Messias.

Under the constitution, the Attorney General must be at least 35 years old. All Attorneys General within the Office must be bar members in Brazil. The Attorney General of the Union is a member of the Brazilian cabinet, holds the rank of Minister, and is also the head of the Advocacia-Geral da União (AGU), which is an essential function and branch of the federal government formed by its own Attorneys.

The Attorneys who compose the AGU are divided in four careers: the Attorney for the National Treasury (Procuradores da Fazenda Nacional), who represent the federal government in tax and financial issues; the Attorney for Brazil (Advogados da União), who represent the government through general cases, the Attorney for the Federal Agencies (Procuradores Federais), who represent the federal agencies; and Attorney for the Central Bank (Procuradores do Banco Central). Their functions are not limited to the Judiciary, and they are also responsible for inside legal control of the government and international legal representation of the Republic.

List of attorneys general

Prosecutor General of Brazil
The prosecutorial duties of the office of the Attorney General were split off to a new Prosecutor General, named Prosecutor General of the Republic, under the Article 4 of the Federal Law No. 73 of 10 February 1993. The Prosecutor General is appointed by the President and confirmed by the Senate. The office of Prosecutor General of the Republic (PGR) is an autonomous agency in charge of criminal prosecution and the defense of society in general, versus the office of the Attorney General, which represents the federal government in legal proceedings. 

The Prosecutor General of the Republic (PGR) is the head of the Federal Prosecution Service (Ministério Público Federal), which is also an essential function but holds the responsibility for criminal prosecution. Differently from the AGU, the members of the Federal Prosecution Service are called "Federal Prosecutor", and are in charge of criminal prosecution at the first level of the Federal Justice. Despite the title, the Federal Prosecutor do not legally represent the Republic in international issues, which is a responsibility of the members of the AGU.

Federal Public Defender General

The Federal Public Defender General oversees the federal public defenders offices.

See also
 Public Procuracy of Brazil
 Prosecutor General of Brazil
 Brazilian Ministry of Justice
 Brazilian Public Prosecutor's Office
 Brazilian Public Defender's Office
 Other attorneys general

References

External links
 Official website of the Office of the Brazilian Attorney General of the Union

Executive branch of Brazil
Office Of The Solicitor-General of the Union In Brazil
Ministries established in 1993